Soldatskoye is a rural locality (a selo) and the administrative center of Soldatskoye Rural Settlement, Rakityansky District, Belgorod Oblast, Russia. The population was 718 as of 2010. There are 16 streets.

Geography 
Soldatskoye is located 19 km south of Rakitnoye (the district's administrative centre) by road. Laptevka is the nearest rural locality.

References 

Rural localities in Rakityansky District